Dr Karl Ritter von Halt, born Karl Ferdinand Halt (2 June 1891 – 5 August 1964) was a sport official in Nazi Germany and in the German Federal Republic. He was born and died in Munich.

Biography
Karl Ritter von Halt was a track and field athlete who competed in the 1912 Summer Olympics. He finished 22nd in the javelin throw competition and 14th in the shot put event. He also participated in the pentathlon competition. There he was eliminated in the third event because he did not finish his 200 m run. He also participated as a member of the German team in the first round of the 4x100 metre relay competition. Halt finished ninth in the decathlon.

He nearly won the decathlon at the 1914 Baltic Games in Malmö, losing to Finland's Johan Svanström by a fraction of a point after a calculation error had been fixed.

In 1921 he became Karl Ritter von Halt after he received the Military Order of Max Joseph.

In 1932 Less than three days before the 10,000 m, a special commission of the IAAF, consisting of the same seven members that had suspended Nurmi, rejected the Finn's entries and barred him from competing in Los Angeles. Sigfrid Edström, president of the IAAF and chairman of its executive council, stated that the full congress of the IAAF, which was scheduled to start the next day, could not reinstate Nurmi for the Olympics but merely review the phases and political angles related to the case. The AP called this "one of the slickest political maneuvers in international athletic history", and wrote that the Games would now be "like Hamlet without the celebrated Dane in the cast." Thousands protested against the action in Helsinki. Details of the case were not released to the press, but the evidence against Nurmi was believed be the sworn statements from German race promoters that Nurmi had received $250–500 per race when running in Germany in autumn 1931. The statements were produced by Karl Ritter von Halt, after Edström had sent him increasingly threatening letters warning that if evidence against Nurmi were not provided he would be "unfortunately obliged to take stringent action against the German Athletics Association."

In 1936 he was named President of the Committee for the organization of the Fourth Winter Olympics in Garmisch by Reichssportführer Hans von Tschammer und Osten. Karl Ritter von Halt was elected as member of the Executive Committee of the International Olympic Committee (IOC) in 1937, a post he held until 1945.

In 1944 Karl Ritter von Halt led the Sports Office of the Third Reich, Nationalsozialistischer Reichsbund für Leibesübungen (NSRL), taking over from Arno Breitmeyer as Reichssportführer. He remained the NSRL leader until the office and the organization were disbanded in 1945 following Nazi Germany's defeat in World War II.

Karl Ritter von Halt was successful in clearing his past as Nazi leader in the post-war years, although tourists to Garmisch protested in 2006 that the town's football stadium was still named after him. It was quietly renamed Stadion am Gröben. Ritter von Halt led the National Olympic Committee of Germany between 1951 and 1961, succeeding Duke Adolf Friedrich of Mecklenburg.

References

External links
list of German athletes

1891 births
1964 deaths
Sportspeople from Munich
German male sprinters
German male javelin throwers
German male shot putters
German decathletes
Olympic athletes of Germany
Athletes (track and field) at the 1912 Summer Olympics
Nazi Party officials
International Olympic Committee members
Presidents of the Organising Committees for the Olympic Games
Knights Commander of the Order of Merit of the Federal Republic of Germany
Knights of the Military Order of Max Joseph
Olympic decathletes